Weimerskirch is a quarter in north-eastern Luxembourg City, in southern Luxembourg. , the quarter has a population of 2,462 inhabitants.

The current district Weimerskirch is called the "little parish" of the city of Luxembourg. In 723 the Franconian Meier gave Charles Martel the Abbey of St. Maximin, Trier, three estates (fiefs), one's own church, Ecclesia Vidmar, later called Wimariecclesia. The territory declared by the gift of real estate in question, why throughout the centuries Weimerskirch the mother parish for a large part of present-day territory of the city of Luxembourg was, and many later emerged from the parish church area.

Weimerskirch was, until the 1950s, known as the residence of the Yenish that has been called Lakerten Dëppegéisser. By 1900 the number of families living here Yenish is estimated to be forty. Yenish is the Weimerskirch still not received written and oral tradition. Thus there are still a number to popular expressions, which are known mainly the native Weimerskirch and it engages occasionally in their expression.

External links
 Weimerskirch information

References

Quarters of Luxembourg City